Robert Dale Talbot (June 6, 1928 – October 31, 2017) was an American professional baseball player and was married to Mada Talbot. Talbot joined the Cubs from their Pacific Coast League team, the Los Angeles Angels. He was born in Visalia, California. Talbot died October 31, 2017.

References

External links

1928 births
2017 deaths
Atlanta Crackers players
Austin Senators players
Chicago Cubs players
Dallas Rangers players
Decatur Commodores players
Des Moines Bruins players
Houston Buffs players
Los Angeles Angels (minor league) players
Louisville Colonels (minor league) players
Major League Baseball outfielders
Selma Cloverleafs players
Springfield Cubs players
Toledo Sox players
Visalia Cubs players
Wichita Braves players
Baseball players from California
Sportspeople from Visalia, California